Perforatella dibothrion is a species of air-breathing land snail, a terrestrial pulmonate gastropod mollusk in the family Hygromiidae.

Distribution 
This species is known to occur in:
 Slovakia
 Ukraine

References

Hygromiidae